Agustín Pipia (1660–1730) was the Master of the Order of Preachers from 1721 to 1725.

Biography

A native of Aragon and a member of the Dominican Order, Agustín Pipia was the Master of the Sacred Palace. In 1721, a Dominican General Chapter elected him to be Master of the Order of Preachers. In 1724, the Dominican Cardinal Orsini became Pope Benedict XIII. The pope often worshiped in Dominican churches and raised the privileges of the order. The pope made Pipia a cardinal in 1724. Pipia died the next year.

References

1660 births
1730 deaths
Spanish Dominicans
Masters of the Order of Preachers
Dominican cardinals